Helly Reitzer was a female Austrian international table tennis player.

She won two bronze medals; one at the 1930 World Table Tennis Championships in the women's doubles with Gertrude Wildam and one in the women's doubles with Lili Forbath at the 1931 World Table Tennis Championships.

See also
 List of table tennis players
 List of World Table Tennis Championships medalists

References

Austrian female table tennis players
World Table Tennis Championships medalists